Mission is a city on the Rosebud Indian Reservation in northern Todd County, South Dakota, United States. The population was 1,156 at the 2020 census.

Mission is home of the Sinte Gleska University. It is the largest incorporated community in the county, but is smaller than the unincorporated community of Rosebud, the capital of the Rosebud Sioux Tribe.

Mission is named for one of the many missions established by religious groups in the late 19th century to educate and assist the Sicangu Lakota (Rosebud Sioux) and other Native American people. The major economic center of the county, it is located at the junction of U.S. routes 18 and 83. The city contains part of the Oyate Trail, the headquarters of the Todd County School District, Cherry-Todd Rural Electric Cooperative, and various federal/tribal agencies.

Geography

Mission has been assigned the ZIP code 57555 and the FIPS place code 42940.

Demographics

The closely linked communities of Antelope and White Horse, and other nearby settlements, including School District and Bureau of Indian Affairs housings and private communities, are located outside the city limits.

2010 census
As of the census of 2010, there were 1,182 people, 398 households, and 298 families living in the city. The racial makeup of the city was 11.7% White, 0.3% African American, 85.4% Native American, 0.1% Asian, 0.2% from other races, and 2.5% from two or more races. Hispanic or Latino of any race were 2.1% of the population.

There were 398 households, of which 57.0% had children under the age of 18 living with them, 21.9% were married couples living together, 39.7% had a female householder with no husband present, 13.3% had a male householder with no wife present, and 25.1% were non-families. 21.4% of all households were made up of individuals, and 5.8% had someone living alone who was 65 years of age or older. The average household size was 2.97 and the average family size was 3.30.

The median age in the city was 23.2 years. 40.1% of residents were under the age of 18; 14.3% were between the ages of 18 and 24; 23.1% were from 25 to 44; 17.2% were from 45 to 64; and 5.2% were 65 years of age or older. The gender makeup of the city was 46.1% male and 53.9% female.

2000 census
As of the census of 2000, there were 904 people, 302 households, and 214 families living in the city. The population density was 1,523.4 people per square mile (591.6/km2). There were 339 housing units at an average density of 571.3 per square mile (221.8/km2). The racial makeup of the city was 74.89% Native American, 22.01% White, 0.11% African American, and 2.99% from two or more races.  Hispanic or Latino of any race were 1.33% of the population.

There were 302 households, out of which 46.7% had children under the age of 18 living with them, 33.4% were married couples living together, 27.5% had a female householder with no husband present, and 29.1% were non-families. 24.5% of all households were made up of individuals, and 7.0% had someone living alone who was 65 years of age or older. The average household size was 2.82 and the average family size was 3.34.

In the city, the population was spread out, with 40.2% under the age of 18, 9.8% from 18 to 24, 25.6% from 25 to 44, 17.7% from 45 to 64, and 6.7% who were 65 years of age or older. The median age was 25 years. For every 100 females, there were 87.2 males. For every 100 females age 18 and over, there were 82.8 males.

As of 2000 the median income for a household in the city was $23,631, and the median income for a family was $21,375. Males had a median income of $25,417 versus $22,778 for females. The per capita income for the city was $11,374. About 29.5% of families and 30.8% of the population were below the poverty line, including 39.0% of those under age 18 and 24.4% of those age 65 or over.

Government
 Mayor: Harvey Herman, Sr.
 Aldermen: President Pat LeBeau, VP Brad Folkers, Sonja Lurz, Phyllis Littau, Lana Story, Ray Stewart.

Notable person
 Bob Barker, former host of The Price Is Right, is 1/8 Sioux. He grew up in Mission, where his mother worked as a teacher on the Indian reservation.

See also
 List of cities in South Dakota

References

External links

 
 Sinte Gleska University (Lakota Studies)

Cities in South Dakota
Cities in Todd County, South Dakota
Populated places established in 1915
1915 establishments in South Dakota
Rosebud Indian Reservation